Sarah Jane Stone (born 23 March 1982) is a former professional tennis player from Australia.

Biography
A doubles specialist from Melbourne, Stone competed on the professional tour in the early 2000s before her career was cut short due to a right foot and back injury.

Stone won 11 ITF doubles titles during her career, eight of which came in the 2002 season. Stone excelled as a doubles player on the ITF junior world tour where she reached the number 8 ranking in the world.

Her best result on the WTA Tour was a quarter-final appearance partnering Samantha Stosur at the 2002 Tasmanian International.

In 2003 she featured in the main draw of the women's doubles at both the Australian Open and Wimbledon. She played in the Australian Open as a wildcard pairing with Samantha Stosur, then at Wimbledon, she and Nicole Sewell played as successful qualifiers after defeating Dinara Safina and Maria Elena Camarin.

Between 2006-2008 Stone worked with WTA tour players Anastasia Rodionova, Romina Oprandi, Vasilisa Bardina and Christina Wheeler.

Now based in the United States, she currently coaches American player Alexa Glatch and Serbian world number 39 Aleksandra Krunic. Stone began working with Krunic's team at Indian Wells in 2018. Under Stone's coaching tutelage Krunic won her first WTA tour title at 'S Hertogenbosch defeating Coco Vandeweghe and Kirsten Flipkens along the way. As a result, Krunic reached a career-high ranking of 39 on the WTA tour.

She was previously the coach of her former doubles partner Samantha Stosur for three years during which time Stosur reached the world number one doubles ranking and won three Grand Slam doubles titles.

In 2015 Stone founded  the Women's Tennis Coaching Association (WTCA) she currently serves as the CEO of the 501 (C3) organization. 
Stone is the chairperson of the women's tennis coaching board of the Professional Tennis Registry.

She is currently a WTA Gold level coach and is a coaching consultant to the SBW Tennis academy in Brentwood Los Angeles.

ITF Circuit finals

Doubles: 21 (11-10)

References

External links
 
 

1982 births
Living people
Australian female tennis players
Australian tennis coaches
Tennis players from Melbourne
21st-century Australian women